Warblade is a comic book character from DC Comics/Wildstorm.

Publication history
Warblade starred in two of his own miniseries,  Warblade: Endangered Species in 1995 and The Razors Edge: Warblade in 2004/2005.

Fictional character biography
Warblade is the special codename picked by Reno Bryce, a long-green-haired artist. In his youth, Reno's parents were killed by the alien Daemonites. Reno survived and swore vengeance against them, dedicating his life to martial arts to avenge them.

He was kidnapped by the organization known as Cyberdata, brainwashed and transformed into a member of their strike team, the S.H.O.C.s. His teammate Misery used her powers to make him think that he was in love with her but quickly changed the focus of her manipulations to Ripclaw. She was revealed to be a traitor and Warblade killed her. After this, Ripclaw attacked Reno, thinking that he was the traitor, as well as for his feelings for Misery, and almost killed him.

Reno was found bleeding in Gamorra by Jacob Marlowe. He was saved by Jacob and joined his Daemonite hunting team, the Wild C.A.T.s. Like many of the Wild C.A.T.s, Reno turned out to be half human and half Kherubim, (also known as a "Gifted One" for his match of human/Kherubim parents) a race of aliens that had fought the Daemonites for millennia.

Warblade met Ripclaw (at this time a member of the Cyberforce) again and after quite some fighting between their teams and the two men themselves, Ripclaw finally saw through all the lies and deception upon Misery's defeat and realized that it was Misery who was the traitor. After the realization that Warblade had not been lying at all, and had been trying to help him the entire time, they became friends and allies.

During his time with the Wild C.A.T.s, Reno fought Pike, a half-human, half-Kherubim assassin. During a Native American ritual, Pike had taken the drug peyote and had a vision of himself killing a Wild C.A.T.s member, a goal he would dedicate the rest of his life to. Their first fight ended indecisive.

Reno went with the Wild C.A.T.s to Khera, home of the Kherubim, where he met other shapeshifters like himself. He became an apprentice to the ancient shapeshifter Lord Proteus at the Shaper's Guild and learned many new ways to use his powers. He was disappointed when fellow Wild C.A.T.s members Voodoo and Spartan uncovered the darker side of Kheran society. The Wild C.A.T.s left Khera soon afterward and returned home.

Back home, Reno stayed with the team and began a relationship with Jules, Emp's assistant. Soon afterwards the team disbanded following the apparent death of their teammate Zealot.

Reno retired and focused on his art. Pike hadn't forgotten his vision though. He attempted to kill Warblade and managed to disperse Warblade's molecules with an explosion that also killed Reno's girlfriend, Jules. Reno was able to literally pull himself back together and wanted revenge. He tracked Pike to Sarajevo, where they fought again. This time Warblade won and he killed Pike and added the final insult to the dying Pike: even if Pike had killed Warblade, he would have failed his quest, because the Wild C.A.T.s had been disbanded for months.

Afterwards he fell into a state of depression, that eventually led to the loss of his powers and his hands. After a little soul searching, some violent confrontations that almost led to his death, and an experimental drug given to him by the scientist responsible for suppressing his alien genes, he regained his powers.

Reno returned to New York City and retired as a superhero. He became a full-time artist again, though he still met up with his teammate Grifter from time to time. He was forced to use his powers again during one of his expositions, when the Kherubim Brotherhood of the Sword turned a large part of New York's population into bloodthirsty creatures.

He appeared briefly during the Captain Atom: Armageddon storyline, before the new Void entity Nikola Hanssen rebooted the Wildstorm Universe into WorldStorm.

WildCats vol. 4
Warblade is one of the several WildCats that Hadrian has managed to recruit; under the black-ops codename of "Cutlery Kid," he is deep in Kaizen Gamorra's extraterrestrial colony, providing intelligence back to Spartan on Earth.

The New 52
Warblade had a role in the series, The Ravagers as Rose Wilson's partner. Warblade is one of the chief members of the Ravagers, the personal army for N.O.W.H.E.R.E.. As such, he follows the orders of N.O.W.H.E.R.E.'s leader Harvest. During the Culling, Warblade was among the members of the Ravagers that tested the survivors of the kill-or-be-killed tournament. During the altercation, several test subjects of the Colony escaped. Along with Rose Wilson, Warblade was tasked with tracking down some of the escapees, as well as to kill Caitlin Fairchild. He is killed by Deathstroke.

In other media
 Warblade appeared in the Wildcats animated series. His voice was provided by Dean McDermott. Here Warblade discovered his powers when he becomes part of the group, in the first episode. Because of this, he was the group's rookie, a position occupied by Voodoo in the comic book. While still an expert martial artist, he's also a computer expert which becomes useful in the overall plot.
 Warblade stars in a solo mini-comic series called Warblade: Endangered Species (#1-4). Warblade makes a trip once a year to Japan, to hone his Martial Arts skills, although this time, he's traveling with the intentions of killing his former best friend—One who has been possessed by a Daemonite during their time in Cyberdata together. It is also in this series that he ends up meeting up with his old ally* Ripclaw—the last member of the Cyberdata team—until he joined Cyberforce. (*former ally turned enemy by a telepath (Misery), who used her powers to try to make everyone kill each other.  After much fighting and Reno almost losing his life, Misery was defeated. Reno and Robert (Ripclaw) would become friends and allies --> *See WildC.A.T.s/Cyberforce "Killer Instinct" Crossover for more details*)
 A Warblade figure from Playmates Toys was released in 1994.

References

                                                                                                                                                                                                                                                                                                     

2004 comics debuts
DC Comics characters who are shapeshifters
Fictional artists
Fictional characters with metal abilities
Fictional melee weapons practitioners
Wildstorm Universe superheroes
WildStorm limited series
WildCats characters
Characters created by Jim Lee
Male characters in animation
Male characters in comics